Mohammad Hossein Mohammadian (born August 19, 1992 in Sari) is an Iranian freestyle wrestler who competes at 97 kilograms. He was a bronze medalist at the 2014 World Championships and at the 2013 Summer Universiade and the 2015 Asian Continental Champion, before receiving a four-year suspension handed by United World Wrestling due to performance-enhancing drugs use in December 2015.

He came back after his suspension in 2019, and has since claimed championships from the 2019 Military World Games and represented Iran at the 2020 Summer Olympics.

Major results

Freestyle record 

! colspan="7"| International Senior Freestyle Matches
|-
!  Res.
!  Record
!  Opponent
!  Score
!  Date
!  Event
!  Location
|-
! style=background:white colspan=7 | 
|-
|Win
|68–8
|align=left| Alikhan Zhabrailov
|style="font-size:88%"|4–3
|style="font-size:88%" rowspan=4|February 24–27, 2022
|style="font-size:88%" rowspan=4|2022 Yasar Dogu
|style="text-align:left;font-size:88%;" rowspan=4|
 Istanbul, Turkey
|-
|Win
|67–8
|align=left| Mustafa Sessiz
|style="font-size:88%"|TF 10–0
|-
|Win
|66–8
|align=left| Mamed Ibragimov
|style="font-size:88%"|TF 16–4
|-
|Win
|65–8
|align=left| Mukhammadrasul Rakhimov
|style="font-size:88%"|TF 11–0
|-
! style=background:white colspan=7 |
|-
|Win
|64–8
|align=left| Esmaiil Eejatian
|style="font-size:88%"|3–1
|rowspan=5|2022
|rowspan=5|2022 Iran Nationals
|rowspan=5| Gorgan
|-
|Win
|63–8
|align=left| FF
|style="font-size:88%"| FF
|-
|Win
|62–8
|align=left| FF
|style="font-size:88%"|Fall
|-
|Win
|61–8
|align=left| Ali Shabani
|style="font-size:88%"|5–4
|-
|Win
|60–8
|align=left| FF
|style="font-size:88%"|TF 10–0
|-
! style=background:white colspan=7 |
|-
|Win
|59–8
|align=left| Mojtaba Goleij
|style="font-size:88%"|2–2
|style="font-size:88%"|12 November 2021
|style="font-size:88%" rowspan=2|2021 Imam Memorial Premier Cup
|style="text-align:left;font-size:88%;" rowspan=1| Tehran, Iran
|-
|Win
|58–8
|align=left| Amirali Azarpira
|style="font-size:88%"|TF 10–0
|style="font-size:88%"|29 October 2021
|style="text-align:left;font-size:88%;" rowspan=1| Tehran, Iran
|-
! style=background:white colspan=7 | 
|-
|Win
|57–8
|align=left| Erik Dzioev
|style="font-size:88%"|TF 10–0
|style="font-size:88%" rowspan=4|November 21–24, 2021
|style="font-size:88%" rowspan=4|2021 CISM World Military Championships
|style="text-align:left;font-size:88%;" rowspan=4|
 Tehran, Iran
|-
|Win
|56–8
|align=left| Mohammed Fardj
|style="font-size:88%"|INJ (8–0)
|-
|Win
|55–8
|align=left| Erik Dzioev
|style="font-size:88%"|TF 10–0
|-
|Win
|54–8
|align=left| Thomas Aboubacar Sylia
|style="font-size:88%"|TF 12–0
|-
! style=background:white colspan=7 |
|-
|Loss
|53–8
|align=left| Elizbar Odikadze
|style="font-size:88%"|3–6
|style="font-size:88%"|August 6, 2021
|style="font-size:88%"|2020 Summer Olympics
|style="text-align:left;font-size:88%;"| Tokyo, Japan
|-
! style=background:white colspan=7 | 
|-
|Win
|53–7
|align=left| Ali Shabani
|style="font-size:88%"|1–1
|style="font-size:88%" rowspan=4|June 8, 2021
|style="font-size:88%" rowspan=4|2021 Poland Open
|style="text-align:left;font-size:88%;" rowspan=4|
 Warsaw, Poland
|-
|Win
|52–7
|align=left| Alireza Karimi
|style="font-size:88%"|2–2
|-
|Win
|51–7
|align=left| Bakytkhanovs
|style="font-size:88%"|TF 10–0
|-
|Win
|50–7
|align=left| Kollin Moore
|style="font-size:88%"|TF 11–0
|-
! style=background:white colspan=7 | 
|-
|Win
|49–7
|align=left| Magomed Ibragimov
|style="font-size:88%"|Forfeit
|style="font-size:88%" rowspan=4|April 11, 2021
|style="font-size:88%" rowspan=4|2021 Asian Olympic Qualification Tournament
|style="text-align:left;font-size:88%;" rowspan=4|
 Almaty, Kazakhstan
|-
|Win
|48–7
|align=left| Satyawart Kadian
|style="font-size:88%"|TF 10–0
|-
|Win
|47–7
|align=left| Zyýamuhammet Saparow
|style="font-size:88%"|TF 15–4
|-
|Win
|46–7
|align=left| Naoya Akaguma
|style="font-size:88%"|TF 11–0
|-
! style=background:white colspan=7 |
|-
|Loss
|45–7
|align=left| Ali Shabani
|style="font-size:88%"|0–4
|style="font-size:88%" rowspan=4|November 5, 2020
|style="font-size:88%" rowspan=4|2020 Iranian World Team Trials
|style="text-align:left;font-size:88%;" rowspan=4|
 Tehran, Iran
|-
|Loss
|45–6
|align=left| Ali Shabani
|style="font-size:88%"|4–8
|-
|Win
|45–5
|align=left| Mojtaba Goleij
|style="font-size:88%"|2–1
|-
|Win
|44–5
|align=left| Danial Shariati
|style="font-size:88%"|5–0
|-
! style=background:white colspan=7 |
|-
|Win
|43–5
|align=left| FF
|style="font-size:88%"|FF
|style="font-size:88%"|12 November 2020
|style="font-size:88%" rowspan=1|2020 Imam Memorial Premier Cup
|style="text-align:left;font-size:88%;" rowspan=3| Tehran, Iran
|-
|Win
|42–5
|align=left| Ali Shabani
|style="font-size:88%"|3–3
|-
|Win
|41–5
|align=left| FF
|style="font-size:88%"|FF
|-
! style=background:white colspan=7 | 
|-
|Win
|40–5
|align=left| Aliaksandr Hushtyn
|style="font-size:88%"|9–0
|style="font-size:88%" rowspan=5|January 15–18, 2020
|style="font-size:88%" rowspan=5|Matteo Pellicone Ranking Series 2020
|style="text-align:left;font-size:88%;" rowspan=5|
 Rome, Italy
|-
|Win
|39–5
|align=left| Abraham Conyedo
|style="font-size:88%"|TF 11–0
|-
|Win
|38–5
|align=left| Kyle Snyder
|style="font-size:88%"|Fall
|-
|Win
|37–5
|align=left| Bo Nickal
|style="font-size:88%"|TF 10–0
|-
|Win
|36–5
|align=left| Alisher Yergali
|style="font-size:88%"|TF 11–0
|-
! style=background:white colspan=7 | 
|-
|Win
|35–5
|align=left| Hossein Shahbazi
|style="font-size:88%"|9–0
|style="font-size:88%" rowspan=3|December 17–21, 2019
|style="font-size:88%" rowspan=3|2019 World Clubs Cup
|style="text-align:left;font-size:88%;" rowspan=3|
 Bojnord, Iran
|-
|Win
|34–5
|align=left| FF
|style="font-size:88%"|FF
|-
|Win
|33–5
|align=left| Givi Gogoberishvili
|style="font-size:88%"|TF 13–2
|-
! style=background:white colspan=7 | 
|-
|Win
|32–5
|align=left| Aliaksandr Hushtyn
|style="font-size:88%"|3–2
|style="font-size:88%" rowspan=4|October 21–24, 2019
|style="font-size:88%" rowspan=4|2019 Military World Games 
|style="text-align:left;font-size:88%;" rowspan=4|
 Wuhan, China
|-
|Win
|31–5
|align=left| Vladislav Baitcaev
|style="font-size:88%"|TF 11–0
|-
|Win
|30–5
|align=left| Mohammed Fardj
|style="font-size:88%"|TF 12–0
|-
|Win
|29–5
|align=left| Andry Vlasov
|style="font-size:88%"|TF 13–2
|-
! style=background:white colspan=7 | 
|-
|Win
|28–5
|align=left| İbrahim Bölükbaşı
|style="font-size:88%"|FF
|style="font-size:88%" rowspan=5|July 24–26, 2015
|style="font-size:88%" rowspan=5|2015 Poland Open
|style="text-align:left;font-size:88%;" rowspan=5|
 Warsaw, Poland
|-
|Win
|27–5
|align=left| Toshihiro Yamaguchi
|style="font-size:88%"|10–1
|-
|Loss
|26–5
|align=left| Elizbar Odikadze
|style="font-size:88%"|2–5
|-
|Win
|26–4
|align=left| Ivan Yankovsk
|style="font-size:88%"|FF
|-
|Win
|25–4
|align=left| Héctor Rodríguez Iglesias
|style="font-size:88%"|TF 11–0
|-
! style=background:white colspan=7 | 
|-
|Win
|24–4
|align=left| Pavlo Oliynyk
|style="font-size:88%"|2–1
|style="font-size:88%" rowspan=4|July 18–19, 2015
|style="font-size:88%" rowspan=4|2015 Stepan Sargsyan Cup
|style="text-align:left;font-size:88%;" rowspan=4|
 Yerevan, Armenia
|-
|Win
|23–4
|align=left| Wynn Michalak
|style="font-size:88%"|9–3
|-
|Win
|22–4
|align=left| Evgeniy Kolomiets
|style="font-size:88%"|7–0
|-
|Win
|21–4
|align=left| Magomedgadzhi Nurov
|style="font-size:88%"|12–10
|-
! style=background:white colspan=7 | 
|-
|Win
|20–4
|align=left| Magomed Musaev
|style="font-size:88%"|10–3
|style="font-size:88%" rowspan=4|May 6–10, 2015
|style="font-size:88%" rowspan=4|2015 Asian Continental Championships 
|style="text-align:left;font-size:88%;" rowspan=4|
 Doha, Qatar
|-
|Win
|19–4
|align=left| Takeshi Yamaguchi
|style="font-size:88%"|14–9
|-
|Win
|18–4
|align=left| Rustam Iskandari
|style="font-size:88%"|TF 13–2
|-
|Win
|17–4
|align=left| Alikhan Jumayev
|style="font-size:88%"|5–2
|-
! style=background:white colspan=7 | 
|-
|Loss
|16–4
|align=left| Jake Varner
|style="font-size:88%"|3–3
|style="font-size:88%" rowspan=2|April 11–12, 2015
|style="font-size:88%" rowspan=2|2015 World Cup 
|style="text-align:left;font-size:88%;" rowspan=2|
 Los Angeles, California
|-
|Win
|16–3
|align=left| İbrahim Bölükbaşı
|style="font-size:88%"|4–4
|-
! style=background:white colspan=7 | 
|-
|Loss
|15–3
|align=left| Sharif Sharifov
|style="font-size:88%"|4–6
|style="font-size:88%" rowspan=4|January 31 – February 1, 2015
|style="font-size:88%" rowspan=4|2015 Grand Prix of Paris 
|style="text-align:left;font-size:88%;" rowspan=4|
 Paris, France
|-
|Win
|15–2
|align=left| Pavlo Oliynyk
|style="font-size:88%"|6–2
|-
|Win
|14–2
|align=left| Milliere Quentin
|style="font-size:88%"|TF 10–0
|-
|Win
|13–2
|align=left| Cui Xiaocheng
|style="font-size:88%"|TF 11–0
|-
! style=background:white colspan=7 | 
|-
|Win
|12–2
|align=left| Gamzat Osmanov 
|style="font-size:88%"|11–2
|style="font-size:88%" rowspan=6|September 8, 2014
|style="font-size:88%" rowspan=6|2014 World Championships
|style="text-align:left;font-size:88%;" rowspan=6|
 Tashkent, Uzbekistan
|-
|Win
|11–2
|align=left| Shinya Matsumoto
|style="font-size:88%"|TF 10–0
|-
|Loss
|10–2
|align=left| Reineris Salas
|style="font-size:88%"|2–4
|-
|Win
|10–1
|align=left| Pedro Ceballos
|style="font-size:88%"|8–6
|-
|Win
|9–1
|align=left| Ed Ruth
|style="font-size:88%"|7–4
|-
|Win
|8–1
|align=left| Adrian Jaoude
|style="font-size:88%"|TF 10–0
|-
! style=background:white colspan=7 | 
|-
|Win
|7–1
|align=left| Amarhajy Mahamedau
|style="font-size:88%"|FF
|style="font-size:88%" rowspan=4|August 2–3, 2014
|style="font-size:88%" rowspan=4|2014 Poland Open
|style="text-align:left;font-size:88%;" rowspan=4|
 Dąbrowa Górnicza, Poland
|-
|Win
|6–1
|align=left| Shinya Matsumoto
|style="font-size:88%"|TF 10–0
|-
|Win
|5–1
|align=left| Ahmet Bilici
|style="font-size:88%"|8–7
|-
|Win
|4–1
|align=left| Gábor Hatos
|style="font-size:88%"|1–1
|-
! style=background:white colspan=7 | 
|-
|Win
|3–1
|align=left| Aslan Kakhidze
|style="font-size:88%"|10–6
|style="font-size:88%" rowspan=4|July 11–16, 2013
|style="font-size:88%" rowspan=4|2013 World University Games
|style="text-align:left;font-size:88%;" rowspan=4|
 Kazan, Russia
|-
|Loss
|2–1
|align=left| Shamil Kudiyamagomedov
|style="font-size:88%"|5–7
|-
|Win
|2–0
|align=left| Musa Murtazaliev
|style="font-size:88%"|8–4
|-
|Win
|1–0
|align=left| Ed Ruth
|style="font-size:88%"|TF 10–0
|-

References

External links
Profile on Sports-Reference Website

Iranian male sport wrestlers
People from Sari, Iran
1992 births
Living people
Iranian sportspeople in doping cases
World Wrestling Championships medalists
Universiade medalists in wrestling
Sportspeople from Sari, Iran
Universiade bronze medalists for Iran
Medalists at the 2013 Summer Universiade
Asian Wrestling Championships medalists
Wrestlers at the 2020 Summer Olympics
Olympic wrestlers of Iran
21st-century Iranian people